The Episcopal Diocese of Alabama is located in Province IV of the Episcopal Church and serves the state of Alabama with the exception of the extreme southern region, including Mobile, which forms part of the Diocese of the Central Gulf Coast. The latter body was formed in 1970 from portions of the territories of the Diocese of Alabama and the Diocese of Florida.

The current and 12th bishop of Alabama is the Right Reverend Dr. Glenda Curry, former rector of All Saints’ Church in Homewood, Alabama (a Birmingham suburb) and a former college administrator. She is assisted by the Right Reverend Brian Prior, former bishop of Minnesota. Curry was elected on January 18, 2020, consecrated on June 27, 2020, and installed as diocesan bishop on January 9, 2021. The Cathedral Church of the Advent in Birmingham serves as its cathedral. The bishop's offices are located at Carpenter House in Birmingham which is next to the Church of the Advent, a pre-existing parish that the diocese designated as its cathedral in 1982.

The diocese currently includes 92 parishes, including college campus ministries and Camp McDowell, the diocesan camp and conference center, located in Nauvoo, Alabama, in the northwestern part of the state.

The total membership of the diocese is estimated at over 30,000 persons. Alabama is the only diocese in the Episcopal Church where there are no mission congregations; that is, all churches are expected to be self-supporting and self-governing parishes, with diocesan subsidies reserved for new church starts only. The policy was instituted by Bishop Furman C. Stough in the 1970s.

Like most of its southern neighbors, the diocese's churchmanship heritage is predominantly of the low variety, reflecting the influence of the founders' origins in places like Virginia and South Carolina. In colonial times, those southern colonies were bastions of evangelical, even Calvinist sentiment among the Anglican clergy and gentry. And like the ECUSA in general, the diocese's members are mostly affluent professionals and businesspeople, often among the wealthiest residents of their respective communities, some of whom have maintained Episcopalian affiliation for several generations. However, these people have largely co-existed peacefully with more liberal parishioners who look upon the Episcopal Church as an alternative to mostly fundamentalist options within Southern Protestantism. This is especially true in some of the smaller municipalities of Alabama where the Diocese has parishes, which are frequently the only churches within their communities that do not hold to strict biblical inerrancy, stringent personal morality, and stridently conservative politics. 

The Anglican realignment movement among conservatives in protest against the consecration of the openly gay bishop Gene Robinson in the 2000s had mostly a minor impact in Alabama. However, the Cathedral Church of the Advent is considered a significant parish among remaining conservative congregations in the Episcopal Church nationally. In a situation that is unusual for cathedrals in the U.S. its relationship to the Diocese of Alabama has been strained. In 2019, the search committee for the new bishop identified the beleaguered relationship as one of four major challenges facing the diocese. The cathedral's vestry announced the resignation of the cathedral's dean, the Very Rev. Andrew Pearson in April 2021. After leaving in May, he was received into the Anglican Church in North America. In late June 2021, the diocesan bishop, Glenda Curry, and the cathedral published a covenant statement recognizing the cathedral's "Protestant, evangelical" expression of Anglicanism and providing a framework for a renewed collaborative relationship.

List of bishops

Churches
The Diocese of Alabama comprises about 92 parishes, including the campus ministries that serve the various colleges and universities in Alabama. Christ Episcopal Church (Tuscaloosa, Alabama) is the oldest parish in continuous existence in the diocese, founded in 1828. The oldest parish in the state of Alabama is Christ Church Cathedral (Mobile, Alabama), but it is presently located in the Diocese of the Central Gulf Coast.

The 1970 division of the Alabama diocese, for most of its history a statewide body, was necessitated because of strong membership growth (both in existing and then-new parishes) in metropolitan areas like Birmingham, Mobile, Montgomery, and Huntsville going back to about 1945, after the end of World War II. Unlike most other Episcopal dioceses, though, growth continued in Alabama long after it dissipated elsewhere in the 1970s and 1980s.

References

External links

Episcopal Diocese of Alabama official website
Journal of the Annual Convention, Diocese of Alabama

Diocese of Alabama
Alabama
Organizations based in Birmingham, Alabama
Province 4 of the Episcopal Church (United States)